Peckham is a district in southeast London.

Peckham may also refer to:

Places
East Peckham, Kent, England
Peckham Bush, Kent, England
West Peckham, Kent, England

People
Ethel Anson Peckham (1879–1965), American horticulturist
George (1845–1914) and Elizabeth Peckham (1854–1940), arachnologists
Harry Peckham (1740-1787) English writer and judge
Sir Henry Peckham (1615–1673), English parliamentarian
John Peckham (c. 1230-1292), Archbishop of Canterbury
Judy Peckham (1950-), Australian runner
Lawrie Peckham (1944-), Australian High jumper
Ray Peckham, Aboriginal Australian activist in the Aboriginal-Australian Fellowship
Rufus Wheeler Peckham (1809–1873), New York Court of Appeals judge
Rufus Wheeler Peckham (1838-1909), U.S. Supreme Court justice
Theo Peckham, NHL defenceman
Wheeler Hazard Peckham (1833-1905), American lawyer
William Pitt Peckham, American politician